John Henry (March 9, 1975 – October 8, 2007) was an American champion Thoroughbred racehorse. He was sired by Ole Bob Bowers (by Prince Blessed) out of Once Double (by Double Jay). John Henry had 39 wins with $6,591,860 in earnings, was twice voted the Eclipse Award for Horse of the Year, and was listed as #23 on Blood Horse magazine's Top 100 U.S. Racehorses of the 20th Century.

Background
The horse was named after the folk hero John Henry. As a colt, John Henry had a habit of tearing steel water and feed buckets off stall walls and stomping them flat. This reminded his owners of the legendary John Henry, who was known as a "steel-drivin' man". He was gelded both for his temperament as well as his lack of good breeding, which meant that he would have been unlikely to be in much demand as a breeding stallion. John Henry was a Golden Chance Farm foal. His sire, Ole Bob Bowers, was sired by Prince Blessed and his dam, Once Double, was sired by Double Jay, a graded stakes race winner.

John Henry was back at the knee (a flaw in conformation that generally makes a long racing career unlikely), undersized, and plainly bred. He was sold as a yearling for $1,100 at the Keeneland January Mixed sale to John Callaway who is credited with giving John Henry his name.

Racing record
John Henry had a series of trainers, and earned money in minor stakes, allowance races, and mid-level claiming races. In 1978, New York City businessman Sam Rubin and his wife Dorothy paid $25,000 sight-unseen for the three-year-old John Henry. Racing under the Rubins' Dotsam Stable banner, he was first conditioned by trainer Robert Donato. Under him, John Henry won 6 of 19 starts and $120,000, starting the year as a cheap claimer and getting his first graded stakes win in the Round Table Handicap at Arlington Park.

In 1979, John Henry was given to a new trainer, Lefty Nickerson. Under him, John Henry won 4 of 11 races in 1979. When the grass season was over in New York, Rubin decided to send the horse to California under trainer Ron McAnally. Under McAnally, John Henry won six stakes races in a row.

Racing through the age of nine, John Henry won the 1981 Santa Anita Handicap and repeated in 1982 after Perrault was disqualified. He is one of only three horses with back-to-back victories in the race's 72-year history. He also won the Arlington Million Stakes twice and won three renewals of both the Hollywood Invitational Handicap and the Oak Tree Invitational Stakes, two Grade I turf stakes in Southern California. He won one of America's most important races for older horses, the 1981 Jockey Club Gold Cup at Belmont Park, at 1½ miles on the dirt. This victory clinched his first Horse of the Year title, and as noted on the CBS telecast of that race (October 10, 1981, https://www.youtube.com/watch?v=DHexkk8Xhl0), becoming the sport's all-time leading money earner.

A bronze statue called Against All Odds, created by Edwin Bogucki, stands on a balcony overlooking the paddock at Arlington Park. It commemorates one of John Henry's most famous finishes; in 1981, at the inaugural Arlington Million, John Henry won over 5-year-old The Bart in a photo finish.

On December 11, 1983, John Henry became the first racehorse to surpass $4 million in career earnings when he won the Hollywood Turf Cup Stakes with jockey Chris McCarron at Hollywood Park Racetrack.

John Henry's last race was the 1984 Ballantine Scotch Classic at the Meadowlands. As he took the lead in the stretch, Meadowlands track announcer Dave Johnson exclaimed, "And down the stretch they come! The old man, John Henry, takes command!" He pulled away to his 39th career victory and his second Horse of the Year title. The final time of 2:13 equaled the track record for 1⅜ mile.

John Henry was a late entry into the Inaugural Breeders Cup in 1984 but a strained ligament in his left foreleg caused him to be withdrawn from the race and retired.

John Henry's final race record stood at 83 starts, 39 wins, 15 seconds, and 9 thirds with $6,591,860 in earnings. He was twice voted the Eclipse Award for Horse of the Year in 1981 and 1984; 1981 being the first unanimous election of the winner. That feat was not repeated until 2015 when Triple Crown winner American Pharoah was also elected unanimously.

Retirement

After retirement, Rubin sent John Henry to the Hall of Champions at Kentucky Horse Park in Lexington. He joined three time Horse of the Year Forego, as well as Standardbred Rambling Willie, and Throroughbreds Rossi Gold and A Letter To Harry. The Hall Of Champions would in time become home to retired Thoroughbred champions Cigar, Da Hoss and Funny Cide.

Regular rider Chris McCarron often described John Henry as very smart, commenting: "I'm just along for the ride." John Henry, in the view of many followers of thoroughbred racing, was one of the best come-from-behind horses (or "closers") in recent history. In The Blood-Horse ranking of the top 100 U.S. thoroughbred champions of the 20th Century, he was ranked #23. John Henry was inducted into the National Museum of Racing and Hall of Fame in Saratoga Springs, New York in 1990.

Death
John Henry was euthanized at 7:05 pm EDT (2305 UTC) on October 8, 2007, at the age of 32. He developed serious kidney problems and stopped responding to veterinary treatment, so the decision was made to put him down. He was buried on the night of his death in front of the Hall of Champions at a spot in front of his paddock. A memorial service was held at the park on October 19.

John Henry's accomplishments
 Oldest horse to win Eclipse Award for Horse of the Year - at age 9
 Oldest horse to win a Grade 1 race - at age 9 (tied)
 Only horse to win the Arlington Million (G1) twice - 1981 & 1984
 One of only three horses to win the Santa Anita Handicap (G1) twice - 1981 & 1982
 Won more graded stakes than any other Thoroughbred - 25
 Retired as the world's richest thoroughbred - July 28, 1985
 Inducted into National Museum of Racing and Hall of Fame in 1990
 Raced in 46 graded (G1, G2, G3) races
 Raced on 18 different North American race tracks
 Won inaugural running of the Arlington Million (1981)
 Oldest horse at age 9 to win the Arlington Million (1984)
 Won on 13 different North American Race Tracks

Pedigree

Through his sire, John Henry was inbred 4 × 4 to Bull Dog, meaning that this stallion appears twice in the fourth generation of his pedigree.

See also

 List of historical horses
 List of leading Thoroughbred racehorses
 Repeat winners of horse races

References

 "Retirement Home" UPI August 2, 1985
 "John Henry, at 11, is returning to races" New York Times May 1, 1986
 "No Comeback" New York Times August 13, 1986
 John Henry's page in the United States' Hall of Fame, with photo and videos
 2005 Bloodhorse.com article Fans Celebrate John Henry's 30th Birthday
 Haskin, Steve. John Henry Eclipse Press (2001) 
John Henry at the Kentucky Horse Park

External links
 A blog site dedicated to John Henry with current information and updates
 Official website of the documentary film

1975 racehorse births
2007 racehorse deaths
Racehorses bred in Kentucky
Racehorses trained in the United States
Horse racing track record setters
American Grade 1 Stakes winners
American Thoroughbred Horse of the Year
United States Thoroughbred Racing Hall of Fame inductees
Eclipse Award winners
Horse monuments
Thoroughbred family 8-c